John Lowery may refer to:
 John 5 (guitarist) (John William Lowery), American guitarist
 John Lowery (bowls), Jersey lawn bowler
 John Harvey Lowery, American physician and philanthropist
 John T. Lowery, Canadian politician and leader of the Alberta Liberal Party

See also
 John Lowry (disambiguation)